Giovanni Ulrico Giacometti (7 March 1868 – 25 June 1933) was a Swiss painter. He was the father of artists Alberto and Diego Giacometti and architect Bruno Giacometti.

Biography 
He was the fourth in a family of eight children. His father, Alberto, was a baker who also ran a café. The painter Augusto Giacometti was his cousin. He received his primary education in Chur. It was there he developed an interest in art from observing the sculptures at the Bianchi marble works.

From 1886 to 1887, he studied at the Kunstgewerbeschule in Munich. He had wanted to attend the Academy of Fine Arts, but was insufficiently prepared. He also took lessons at two private schools and copied Old Masters at the Alte Pinakothek. Ultimately, he decided that Munich was not right for him, so he and his friend, Cuno Amiet, went to Paris where they studied with William Adolphe Bouguereau and Joseph Nicolas Robert-Fleury at the Académie Julian until 1891, when financial difficulties forced him to return home.

In a short time, he began to feel isolated there and, in the summer of 1893, went to Rome, but found little inspiration. After a brief stay in Torre del Greco, broke and ill, he once again returned to Switzerland. The following year, he met and befriended the painter Giovanni Segantini who, despite being only ten years older, became an invaluable mentor; introducing him to the beauty of mountainous landscapes and the Divisionist style. In 1898, he achieved his first major success at the Kunsthaus Zürich in a joint exhibition with his friend, Amiet, and Ferdinand Hodler.

In 1899, Segantini died suddenly, of peritonitis, aged only forty-one. Giacometti was deeply saddened but, in 1900, met and married Annetta Stampa (1871–1964), the daughter of a country school teacher. They had four children; their three famous sons and a daughter, Ottilia (1904–1937), who died in childbirth. In 1904, they moved to her home town of Borgonovo, a mountain village in Bergell. They spent their summers in Maloja where his friend, Segantini, had lived. He was kept busy there with numerous commissions for paintings and book illustrations.

In 1908, he received an invitation from Die Brücke, an artists' group, to exhibit in Dresden. He participated in a showing by the Berlin Secession in 1911 and had his first solo exhibition at the Kunsthaus Zürich the following year. His first retrospective came in 1920. Over the course of his career, he moved from Divisionism to Post-Impressionism, then on to Expressionism; with some works in the Symbolist and Art Nouveau styles along the way.

Selected paintings

References

Further reading 
 Dieter Schwarz, Paul Müller, Viola Radlach: "Giovanni Giacometti 1868–1933", Œuvrekataloge Schweizer Künstler, in 3 volumes
 Christine E. Stauffer: Giovanni Giacometti. Das graphische Werk. Verlag Kornfeld, Bern 1997. 
 Giovanni Giacometti (1868–1933). Arbeiten auf Papier. Exhibition catalog, with text by Ulrich Gerster, Christoph Vögele and Beate Stutzer. Kunstmuseum Solothurn/Bündner Kunstmuseum, Chur. Kehrer Verlag, Heidelberg 2006.

External links 

 
 
 
 
 "Giovanni Giacometti – ein Vorbild für Avantgarde-Kunstler" by Anna Quirin, Deutschlandfunk, 11 March 2018

1868 births
1933 deaths
People from Maloja District
Swiss-Italian people
19th-century Swiss painters
Swiss male painters
20th-century Swiss painters
20th-century Swiss male artists
19th-century Swiss male artists
Alberto Giacometti
Académie Julian alumni